Traveller is a 1997 American crime film directed by Jack N. Green. It follows a man and a group of nomadic con artists in North Carolina.

Cast

 Bill Paxton as Bokky
 Mark Wahlberg as Pat O'Hara
 Julianna Margulies as Jean
 James Gammon as Double D
 Luke Askew as Boss Jack Costello
 Danielle Keaton as Shane
 Nikki DeLoach as Kate
 Michael Shaner as Lip
 Rance Howard as Farmer
 Jean Speegle Howard as Bokky's Grandmother
 Andrew Porter as Pincher
 Robert Peters as Farmer's Son
 Jo Ann Pflug as Boss Jack's Wife
 John Bennes as Hearse Driver
 Barbara Rowan as Pregnant Wife
 Trenton McDevitt as Pregnant Wife's Husband
 Moses Gibson as Porter
 Bonnie Johnson as Cashier
 John Paxton as Financial Planner
 Jim Flowers as Bar regular #1
 Frederick E. Dann as Bar Regular #2
 Walter Cobb as Priest
 Joanne Pankow as Elderly Woman
 Chuck Kinlaw as Elderly Woman's Son
 Ted Manson as First Trailer Buyer

Reception
The film received positive reviews from critics. Review aggregation website Rotten Tomatoes gives the film a score of 79% based on reviews from 28 critics, with an average rating of 6.4/10.

Home media
The film was released on DVD on July 25, 2000. The film was released as part of a Blu-ray Disc double feature with Telling Lies in America from Shout! Factory on May 25, 2012.

References

External links 
 
 

1997 films
1997 crime drama films
American crime drama films
American romantic drama films
1990s English-language films
Films shot in North Carolina
1990s American films